The following is a list of historically famous prison escapes, and of people who escaped multiple times:

Famous historical escapes
There have been many infamous escapes throughout history:

13th century
 In 1244, whilst imprisoned in the Tower of London, Gruffydd ap Llywelyn Fawr crafted a makeshift rope made of bed sheets and cloths, lowered it, and climbed down. However, because he was heavy, the rope broke and he fell to his death.

17th century
 In 1621 Dutch author Hugo de Groot escaped from Loevestein Castle, where he was held captive, by hiding himself inside a book chest. He was then smuggled outside.

18th century
 Englishman Jack Sheppard took to theft and burglary in 1723, and was arrested and imprisoned five times in 1724 but escaped four times, making him a notorious public figure and wildly popular with the poorer classes.
 The Italian author and adventurer Giacomo Casanova escaped from prison in 1757.

19th century

 On November 27, 1863, John Hunt Morgan and six of his officers, most notably Thomas Hines, escaped from their cells in the Ohio Penitentiary by digging a tunnel from Hines' cell into the inner yard and then ascending a wall with a rope made from bunk coverlets and a bent poker iron.
 In the Libby Prison escape, during the American Civil War, over 109 Union POWs broke out of a building at Libby Prison in Richmond, Virginia on the night between February 9 and February 10, 1864. Fifty-nine of the 109 prisoners successfully made it back to the Union lines; two were drowned in the nearby James River, and forty-eight were recaptured.
Anarchist activist Peter Kropotkin managed to escape from a low-security prison in St. Petersburg. He hid himself in one of the finest restaurants there and later moved to England.
The notorious outlaw Billy the Kid managed to escape from prison in 1881, but was captured and shot by Pat Garrett only a few months later.

1900–1949
 In 1901, Lum You was convicted of murder and sentenced to death by a Pacific County, Washington court.  He enjoyed great public sympathy, including from county officials, who supposedly allowed him to escape by leaving his cell door unlocked at night. He eventually seized the opportunity, but within a few days he either gave himself up or was recaptured.
 German Naval Air Service Kapitänleutnant Gunther Plüschow escaped from the Donington Hall prisoner of war camp in 1915.
 Frederick Mors, an Austrian-born American serial killer, was declared insane and placed into the Matteawan Institution for the Insane in the United States in 1915. He escaped in 1916 and was never seen again but supposedly resurfaced in Connecticut in 1917. His body was possibly found in 1923 and identified as a suicide.
 In 1921, at age 22 Victor Folke Nelson made a sensational and highly publicized run and escape from a line of 13 prisoners after attending chapel at the Charlestown State Prison. Despite an attempted intervening tackle from a prisoner trusty and bullets from a guard's gun, Nelson ran some distance, leapt, caught the lower end of the window bars, and scaled the 40-foot high wall of the prison's Cherry Hill section. At the top of the wall, he performed "what was always believed an impossible stunt: throwing his body across a 10-foot space to the wall," where he managed to catch hold of the coping of a nearby structure and then to drop 30 feet down to the Boston and Maine railroad tracks.  He was convinced to volitionally return to prison by his respected mentor and progressive penologist Thomas Mott Osborne several months later. 
 In 1922, an IRA bomb blew a hole in the wall of the Jail in Dundalk, County Louth, Ireland. 106 IRA prisoners escaped. A few weeks later, these same prisoners returned fully armed, and took over the whole prison, freeing remaining prisoners.
 Leonard T. Fristoe was imprisoned for double murder in 1920 of a police Constable and a deputy Sherriff in Nevada. He escaped from Nevada State Prison in 1923. He lived for nearly 46 years under the allias of Claude R. Willis, before being turned in by his own son. After serving several years in prison he died of natural causes.
 John Dillinger served time at the Indiana State Penitentiary at Michigan City, until 1933, when he was paroled. Within four months, he was back in jail in Lima, Ohio, but his gang sprang him, killing the jailer, Sheriff Jessie Sarber. Most of the gang was captured again by the end of the year in Tucson, Arizona, due to a fire at the Historic Hotel Congress. Dillinger alone was sent to the Lake County jail in Crown Point, Indiana. He was to face trial for the suspected killing of police officer William O'Malley during a bank shootout in East Chicago, Indiana, some time after his escape from jail. During this time on trial, a famous photograph was taken of Dillinger putting his arm on prosecutor Robert Estill's shoulder when suggested to him by reporters.
 On March 3, 1934, Dillinger escaped from the "escape-proof" (as it was dubbed by local authorities at the time) Crown Point, Indiana county jail, which was guarded by many police officers and national guardsmen. Newspapers reported that Dillinger had escaped using a fake gun made from wood, blackened and shined with shoe polish.
 French prisoner René Belbenoît escaped from the penal colony of French Guiana on March 2, 1935 when he and five others took to the sea with a boat they had bought. After a series of daring adventures, during which all of the other escapees were captured, he reached the United States in 1937. In 1938 his account, Dry Guillotine, was published. Belbenoît had written it in French and it was translated in English by Preston Rambo. It went through 14 printings in less than a year.
 Japanese prisoner Yoshie Shiratori broke out of prison four times, first from Aomori Prison (1936), Akita Prison (1942), Abashiri Prison (1944), and Sapporo Prison (1947). A novel and TV-drama Hagoku was based on his true story.
 Fort San Cristóbal is located on the top of the mountain San Cristóbal, which is very close (4 km) to Pamplona, Spain. Built inside the mountain, it served as a prison despite the fact that it had been obsolete since its opening in 1919, due to its weakness against aviation. On May 22, 1938, during the Spanish Civil War, around 30 prisoners organised a mutiny for a massive prison break. 792 prisoners fled but only three succeeded in getting to the French border; 585 were arrested, 211 died and 14 of the arrested who were considered the leaders were sentenced to death. Most fugitives were intercepted during the following days. In 1988, a sculpture was erected to honour the memory of the prisoners who died there. The fort ceased to be a prison in 1945.
 Colditz Castle was used as an "escape-proof" prisoner-of-war camp during World War II, but over the course of 300 escape attempts, 130 prisoners escaped. Thirty escapees eventually managed to reach friendly territory. The men had tunneled, disguised themselves as guards, workmen or women, sneaked away through sewer drains, and even built a glider in a plan to get over the wall.
 André Devigny, a French resistance fighter during World War II, escaped Montluc Military Prison in Lyons with his cellmate in April 1943.
 French author Henri Charrière tried to escape in vain several times, but eventually was successful in 1943. His story, Papillon, was published and filmed under the same name.
 In the Great Escape, 76 Allied POWs (primarily Commonwealth airmen) escaped from Stalag Luft III during World War II. 73 of the escapees were captured and fifty of them were executed by the Gestapo, while only three succeeded in reaching neutral territories.
 In the Cowra breakout, at least 545 out of 1,004 Japanese POWs escaped from Number 12 POW Compound at Cowra on the night of 4 August 1944. Out of the roughly 500 escapees, 231 died  and 108 were wounded. 31 killed themselves and 12 were burnt to death in huts set on fire by the Japanese. Sixteen of the wounded showed signs of attempted suicide.
 In the Latrun Prison break, 20 members of the Jewish underground group Lehi escaped from Latrun prison camp in Latrun, Mandatory Palestine (now Israel), through a 76 meter long tunnel on the night of October 31, 1943.
 In the Great Papago Escape, over 25 German POWs escaped by tunneling out of Camp Papago Park POW facility, near Phoenix, Arizona, on the night of December 23, 1944. They then fled into the surrounding desert but because the rivers in Arizona were mostly dry and had not been navigable for decades, most of them were recaptured without bloodshed over the next few weeks.
 In the Acre Prison break, 28 members of the Jewish underground groups Irgun and Lehi escaped from Acre Prison in Acre, Mandatory Palestine (now Israel) on May 4, 1947.
 12 members of the Jewish underground groups Irgun and Lehi escaped from the central prison (today the Museum of Underground Prisoners) in Jerusalem, Mandatory Palestine, on February 20, 1948.

1950–1975
 In 1955, serial killer Edward Edwards pushed past a guard and escaped from an Akron, Ohio jail while being held on burglary charges. By 1961, he was on the FBI's Ten Most Wanted Fugitives list. Edwards was captured in Atlanta, Georgia on January 20, 1962.
 In 1959, Frank Freshwaters escaped from an Ohio prison while serving a sentence of involuntary manslaughter from a 1957 car accident. After 56 years he was arrested in Florida.
 In the Alcatraz escape on June 11, 1962, American criminals brothers John and Clarence Anglin, and Frank Morris escaped Alcatraz Federal Penitentiary on Alcatraz Island using an inflatable raft, never to be seen again. It was never determined by the FBI whether they succeeded in their escape or died in the attempt.
 In 1966, serial killer Monroe Hickson escaped from the Manning Correctional Institution. In 1967, he was added on the FBI's Ten Most Wanted Fugitives list. The body of a deceased farm worker in Chapel Hill, North Carolina was confirmed to have been Hickson in 1968.
In 1971, a 45 meter long tunnel was dug and 111 political prisoners, including future president José Mujica, escaped from the high security Punta Carretas Penitentiary in Montevideo, Uruguay. It was the largest prison escape in history.
 In 1973, three Provisional Irish Republican Army prisoners escaped in the Mountjoy Prison helicopter escape, when a hijacked helicopter landed in the exercise yard at Mountjoy Prison, Dublin, Republic of Ireland.
 In 1974, Thomas Knight, a man awaiting trial for a double murder, escaped from the Miami-Dade County Jail, along with ten other prisoners. Eight of the eleven escapees were captured within two days but Knight remained a fugitive for over three months. While on the run, Knight committed another murder. He was captured in New Smyrna Beach, Florida, and later executed in 2014.
 In 1975 Billy Hayes, a convicted drug smuggler escaped from a İmralı prison on an island in the Sea of Marmara, Turkey, using a rowboat. He made his way to Greece, where he was eventually deported to the U.S. Hayes wrote a book on his experiences, Midnight Express, which was later adapted into the 1978 film of the same name starring Brad Davis as Hayes.

1976–1999
 On 5 April 1976, in the Segovia prison break, twenty nine prisoners escaped from prison, in Spain's largest prison break since the country's civil war. The majority belonged to the Basque separatist group ETA. The majority of prisoners were recaptured in shoot outs with the authorities in the next few days, during which one escapee was killed, though four managed to escape to France.     
 On 10 June 1977, the convicted murderer of Martin Luther King Jr., James Earl Ray, escaped from Brushy Mountain State Penitentiary in Tennessee, along with six others. Ray was recaptured after two days. He had been running and hiding in the mountainous forest surrounding the prison.
 On 23 September 1977, a group of seven prisoners, including Patrick Kimumwe, escaped from the fortified compound of the State Research Bureau, the Ugandan intelligence agency during the rule of Idi Amin.
 Serial killer Carlton Gary escaped from a low-security prison by sawing through the bars of his cell. Later on 15 March 1983, Gary escaped again from police custody.
 In 1977, convicted murderer James Robert Jones escaped from prison in Kansas, and lived in Florida for 37 years under the alias of Bruce Walter Keith. He was arrested in March 2014. It is assumed that he used someone else's identity.
 On 30 December 1977, serial killer Ted Bundy escaped from prison while most of the guards were off for Christmas. He did so by sawing through the vent of his cell with a hacksaw blade, ending up in the chief jailer's apartment (who was away on Christmas break). He then stole some clothes from a closet and left the building. Earlier in June he escaped from a courthouse by jumping out a window in the court's law library.
 In 1979, Assata Shakur successfully escaped prison in Union, New Jersey when three members of the Black Liberation Army took prison guards as hostages, freed Shakur and fled in a prison van. No one was injured during the prison break, including the guards-turned-hostages who were left in the parking lot. In 1984, Shakur escaped to Cuba where she gained political asylum. Shakur was moved to the FBI's Most Wanted Terrorists List on May 2, 2013.
 In 21 January 1980, three prisoners of Basque separatist group ETA (pm) escaped from the prison of San Sebastian. They were: Izaskun Arrazola, Jesus Maria Salegi and Mikel Matxirena. They mingled with visiting relatives and walked out the front door.
 On 23 July 1980, Zdzisław Najmrodzki, had escaped from the prison in Gliwice, Poland, by jumping from the barred window. His crewmates had partially sawn off the bars a few days prior to escape which allowed him to break them. Najmrodzki slid down the line outside the building and got to the awaiting him a motorcycle. Overall, between 1974, and 1989, he had escaped in total 29 times from prisons and the authorities.
 On 11 April 1981, convicted murderer Edward Dean Kennedy escaped from the Union Correctional Facility in Florida, and hours later would be murdering a state trooper and the trooper's cousin. He was eventually recaptured, was sentenced to death and was executed in 1992.
 On 2 March 1982 in Peru, PCP guerilla fighters assaulted the Ayacucho prison, resulting in the release of 255 inmates.
 In the 1983 Batticaloa Jailbreak on 23 September 1983, 41 Tamil political prisoners and 151 criminal prisoners escaped in eastern Sri Lanka.
 In the Maze Prison escape on 25 September 1983, 38 Provisional Irish Republican Army members escaped from HMP Maze in Northern Ireland, the biggest prison escape in Irish or British history.
 On 7 July 1985, in prison of San Sebastian two prisoners escaped: Joseba Sarrionandia and Iñaki Pikabea. Both of them belonged to the Basque separatist group ETA and they managed to escape as there was a concert in the jail with Basque singer Imanol Larzabal. They hid themselves inside two loudspeakers. The Basque Radical Rock group Kortatu created the song Sarri, Sarri in honor of this escape, which became a big hit. The escape was planned with theater critic Mikel Albisu, who would become the leader of ETA. He drove the van when they escaped. During three months, the two fugitives and Antza were hiding in a flat in San Sebastián, before moving to France. Since that day Sarrionandia has lived exiled in secret during more than 30 years and the topic of exile is foremost in his writings.
 On 3 September 1989, Zdzisław Najmrodzki, had escaped from the prison in Gliwice, Poland, via tunnel. While walking at the prison yard, he had fallen underground into the tunnel, dug over the course of 3 weeks by his mother and a crewmate. From the tunnel, he had got to the motorcycle prepared for him outside the prison. Overall, between 1974, and 1989, he had escaped in total 29 times from prisons and the authorities.
 In 1984, six death row inmates, including the Briley Brothers (Linwood and James), escaped Mecklenburg Correctional Center, making it the largest mass death row escape in American history. All were recaptured within 18 days, and all six men would eventually be executed. The final execution took place in 1996. 
 On 4 December 1986, William Scott Day escaped a psychiatric center in Ypsilanti, Michigan, then embarking on a killing spree in several states spanning 39 days. He was eventually re-captured and sentenced to life imprisonment in Tennessee, which he served until his death in 2006.
 In November 1987 Peter Thomson aged 19 at the time escaped from Winchester Prison. During a 2 hour window of opportunity, Peter Thomson broke out from the education wing onto the grounds and promptly made his way over the prison wall. A large-scale search was made of the surrounding area, but he was never found. 
 On 7 March 1993, Peter Gibb and Archie Butterley escaped from the Melbourne Remand Centre in Australia, with the help of prison guard Heather Parker who was having a relationship with Gibb. Police found Butterley shot dead six days later and re-captured Gibb.
 In 1993, ten prisoners escaped from Pārlielupe prison in Jelgava, Latvia. The following year, 95 prisoners escaped through a tunnel they had excavated. As of August 2005, four prisoners, two from each of the escapes, were still at large.
 In 1994 Arthur Rudy Martinez, an inmate serving a life sentence after being convicted of numerous rapes and robberies, escaped from a Washington State prison and eluded capture for nearly two decades. He later turned himself in to authorities after being diagnosed with cancer in an attempt to take advantage of free medical care he would receive in prison. He died two months later.
 Trikala, Greece, on 23 May 1995, Albanian inmates staged a daring escape from an old Turkish administration building-turned-prison, using weight dumbbells to break the locks of the gates and bed springs as a ladder to scale the wall. 29 prisoners escaped, and about half of them absconded to Albania and were never recaptured. Only Albanian inmates escaped, having kept escape plans secret from the prison's international population.
 On March 17, 1995, in Sublette, Kansas Dawn Amos, Douglas Winter and David Spain escaped in the early morning hours after shooting Sheriff Deputy, Irvin Powell twice. The trio later fled to Colorado where an elderly man was kidnapped and later released unharmed. Powell later died of his injuries in an Oklahoma City hospital three days later.
 In the 1995 Vellore Fort Jailbreak on 15 August 1995, 43 Tamil Tiger inmates escaped from Vellore Fort prison in India.
 On August 27, 1995, multiple prisoners escaped from Vridsløselille Prison in Copenhagen, Denmark after a bulldozer was driven into the prison wall.
 In January 1997, Korean criminal Shin Chang-won escaped from Busan Prison in South Korea.
 In April 1998, the Belgian child molester Marc Dutroux managed to escape for several hours. He was caught the same afternoon, but the incident forced two politicians to resign and deepened the loss of faith in the Belgian judicial system.
 Martin Gurule escaped from the Texas Death Row at Ellis Unit in 1998. He was found dead a few days later.
 In 1999, Leslie Dale Martin and three other inmates on Louisiana's death row escaped from their cells at the Louisiana State Penitentiary. They were caught within hours, before they even managed to escape prison grounds. The four men had managed the escape with the use of hacksaws that had been smuggled in for them by a bribed corrections officer. Other officers were inattentive to the inmates' two to three week effort at cutting their cell doors and window. After the escape, two corrections officers were fired and two others were demoted. Two corrections officers later overheard Martin plotting another escape, which included taking hostages and commandeering a vehicle to ram the prison's front gates. Martin was immediately moved to the holding cell outside the death chamber, a month before his execution in 2002.

2000–present
 The Texas 7 escaped from John B. Connally Unit on December 13, 2000. Six of them were captured after over a month and a half on the run; the seventh killed himself before being captured.
 In January 2001, three inmates escaped from Chicago State Penitentiary's H-Unit (Hi-Max). One of them was injured during the escape, and while trying to get back into the prison, he got caught in the razor between the fences.
 In New York, convicted murderers Timothy A. Vail and Timothy G. Morgan escaped from Elmira State Penitentiary in July 2003; both were recaptured in two days.
 Colton Harris-Moore fled a three-year sentence by walking out of a halfway house in April 2008. On 11 July 2010, he was captured at Harbour Island, Bahamas and sent back to Seattle.
 The Sarposa Prison attack was a raid on the Kandahar detention facility in Kandahar, Afghanistan by Taliban insurgents on June 13, 2008. One of the largest attacks by Afghan insurgents, the raid freed 400–1000 prisoners.
 On August 4, 2008, Sarah Jo Pender escaped from Rockville Correctional Facility with the help of prison guard Scott Spitler, who was expecting a $15,000 payment. She remained on the run for four months.
 Eight inmates charged with violent crimes escaped from the Curry County Adult Detention Center in Clovis, New Mexico on August 24, 2008. The men escaped by climbing prison pipes in a narrow space inside a wall, then using homemade instruments to cut a hole in the roof. The jailbreak was featured on a September 6 episode of America's Most Wanted. As of October 2010, convicted murderer Edward Salas was the only inmate still at large. Salas was taken into custody by the U.S. Marshals Service on Thursday, October 4, 2012, in Chihuahua City, Mexico, and was extradited back to New Mexico.
 Lance Battreal, Charles Smith, and Mark Booher escaped from a Michigan City, Indiana prison on July 12, 2009 through tunnels under the prison yard. Smith was captured on July 20, 2009 near Chicago Mayor Richard M. Daley's vacation home in Grand Beach, Michigan. Battreal was captured on July 21, 2009 at his mother's house in Rockport, Indiana. Booher was captured on July 23, 2009 in a hotel in Indianapolis, Indiana.
 On March 30, 2010, three inmates, Quentin Truehill, Kentrell Johnson, and Peter Hughes escaped from Avoyelles Parish Sheriff's Office in Mansura, Louisiana after holding an officer hostage. They went on a crime spree through Louisiana and Florida that included multiple robberies and thefts, and all three participated in the kidnap and murder of Florida State University grad student, Vincent Binder. They were ultimately apprehended nearly two weeks after the escape in Miami, Florida. Hughes and Johnson are currently serving life in prison for Binder's murder, and Truehill is sitting on Florida's death row for the same offense. 
Three inmates at an Arizona for-profit Management and Training Corporation-operated facility escaped on July 30, 2010. Daniel Renwick and Tracy Province were murderers and John McCluskey had been convicted of attempted murders. Renwick was captured in a shootout in Rifle, Colorado on August 1, 2010. Though he still had 32 years on his sentence in Arizona, he was sentenced to 60 years to be served in Colorado. Province, already a lifer, was captured on August 9, 2010, in Meeteetse, Wyoming. After being sentenced to 38 1/3 years in Arizona, he was quickly extradited to face murder charges in New Mexico. McCluskey, who had been doing consecutive 15-year sentences, was captured with Casslyn Welch, his cousin/accomplice, in eastern Arizona on August 19 in the Apache-Sitgreaves National Forest. He was sentenced to 43 years in an Arizona prison on escape, kidnap, hijacking, and robbery charges. Like Province, Welch, and McCluskey were soon extradited for the alleged robbery, hijack, and murder of two vacationers in New Mexico. Kenneth John Gonzales, the U.S. Attorney in New Mexico, filed death penalty charges against all three. McCluskey was convicted after a three-month trial in Albuquerque on October 7, 2013, after Province and Welch testified against him, conditions of their plea bargains. The death penalty phase of the proceedings began on October 21, but the jury delivered a sentence of life imprisonment for McCluskey, and Province received the same. Welch was sentenced to 40 years. 
 On August 28, 2012, Darnell Keith Washington escaped from the Glen Helen Rehabilitation Center in San Bernardino County, California. The escape happened with the help of his wife, and they later went on a month-long crime spree across southern California, consisting of multiple carjackings, robberies and one murder. The couple was recaptured in Washington state on October 5, and were extradited to California. Tania was sentenced to 23-years imprisonment in May 2016, and Darnell was sentenced to death months later.
 On July 27, 2013, 1,000 inmates escaped from the Queyfiya prison near Benghazi, Libya. The escape occurred after a wave of political assassinations and attacks on political offices around the country. Local residents of Benghazi forced the inmates out of the prison.
 In October 2013, Kevin Patrick Stoeser escaped from the Austin Transitional Center where he was serving the remainder of a 156-month sentence for four counts of child sexual assault and one count of possession of child pornography. He had pleaded guilty to these charges in 2003. He was never captured, but DNA-confirmed remains of his skull were found near Del Valle, Texas on September 8, 2014.
On June 7, 2014, Serge Pomerleau, 49, Denis Lefebvre, 53, and Yves Denis, 35, escaped from a Quebec detention center with help from a helicopter. The three men were arrested a couple of weeks later and returned to the same facility.
On June 8, 2014, Robert Elbryan, 42, George Broussard, 64, and Christopher Boris, 52, escaped from a Quebec detention center with help from a helicopter. The three men were arrested a couple of weeks later and returned to the same facility.
On September 11, 2014, T.J. Lane, 19, serving three life sentences for indiscriminately killing fellow students at his Ohio high school in 2012, Clifford E. Opperud, 45, serving 12 years for robbing, burglary and kidnapping, and Lindsey Bruce, 33, sentenced to life imprisonment for the murder of a 5-year-old girl, escaped Allen-Oakwood Correctional Institution by scaling a fence. Bruce was captured a few minutes after the escape, Lane was apprehended about 5 hours, and Opperud about 8 hours later.
On June 6, 2015, Richard Matt, 48, and David Sweat, 34, were discovered missing from the Clinton Correctional Facility in Dannemora, New York during a headcount at 5:30am. An "external breach" was found on a street approximately 500 feet south of the prison wall. Both inmates had been convicted of murder. Richard Matt was shot dead on June 26, 2015, near Lake Titus in Upstate New York. Two days later on June 28, 2015, David Sweat was captured just miles from the Canada–US border, shot twice before being taken to a local hospital.
In June 2015, two convicts escaped maximum security in the Tihar Prison Complex in Delhi, India by digging a tunnel under a wall and scaling it
On July 11, 2015, Mexican drug lord Joaquín Guzmán Loera, also known as "El Chapo", escaped from Federal Social Readaptation Center No.1, a maximum security prison. His escape involved an elaborate tunnel leading from the shower area in his cell stretching 1.5  km to a house construction site. The shower area in his cell was not detectable to the security cameras, creating a blind spot. The tunnel lay 10 meters underground and was equipped with a ladder to climb to the bottom, artificial lights, air ducts, and various construction materials. A makeshift motorcycle was found in the tunnel, believed to have been used to excavate the tons of earth removed, transport materials, and Guzmán himself. An investigation and manhunt quickly followed. He was recaptured on January 8, 2016.
On January 22, 2016, three inmates escaped the Orange County Men's Central Jail, a maximum security jail in Orange County, California. The three inmates (Jonathan Tieu, 20; Hossein Nayeri, 37; and Bac Tien Duong, 43) cut through steel bars, made their way through plumbing tunnels, and used a makeshift rope made out of bedsheets to rappel down the multistory facility. Bac Tien Duong surrendered to police in Santa Ana CA on January 29. The other two inmates, Hossein Nayeri and Jonathan Tieu were arrested in San Francisco on January 30.
On 7 November 2016, two inmates escaped HMP Pentonville in North London. The two inmates (Mathew Baker and James Whitlock) used diamond-tipped cutting equipment to break through cell bars before they scaled the perimeter wall. They left mannequins in their beds to fool the prison guards. Two days later, Baker was found – with dyed hair and a fractured leg – hiding under a bed at his sister's home. Whitlock was found at an address in Homerton, east London, after six days on the run.
On 5 April 2019, about 200 the Islamic State of Iraq and the Levant detainees revolted and attempted to escape from Dêrik prison in al-Malikiyah, Syria. The breakout was foiled, and some of the prisoners were subsequently distributed to other detention centers.
On November 3, 2019, Samuel Fonseka, 21, and Jonathan Salazar, 20, both convicted murderers, escaped from the Monterey County Jail, located in Salinas, California. The two men escaped after using a "hard-plastic" cleaning brush to knock a hole in the restroom sheetrock ceiling. The hole was in a blindspot in the communal bathroom that could only be seen by someone inside the restroom. They then escaped by going through the 11-inch-wide hole, then through a maintenance gap between walls, and finally out a hatch that was kicked open, with the cameras nearby blocked by recent construction. After they escaped, they took off their jail suits; they were wearing street clothes underneath that allowed them to blend in as they headed to Tijuana, Mexico. Fonseca and Salazar had been in rival gangs and were not known to associate with each other before being housed in the same unit of the jail. Similarly, it is unknown why the two headed for Tijuana, how they made the 7-hour trip, and why they tried to re-enter the United States from Mexico around midnight three days after their escape, only to be arrested by the U.S. Marshals on the border. Fonseca was accused of killing two men over three days in Salinas in June 2018. Salazar was arrested in the October 2017 shooting death of a Salinas man and the wounding of the man's wife while the couple drove in a Salinas neighborhood.
On April 16, 2020, James Newman and Thomas Deering escaped the Columbia Correctional Institution in Portage, Wisconsin. They were aided in their escape by a civilian Food Service worker. They were captured the following morning in Rockford, Illinois after showing up at a homeless shelter looking for food and clothing. The founder of the shelter recognized the men and called police, stalling the escapees with coffee and cigarettes.
On September 6, 2021, Zakaria Zubeidi and five other Palestinian militants escaped by tunnel from Gilboa Prison in Israel.
On December 1, 2021, a group of gangsters broke into a prison in Tula, Mexico, freeing nine inmates (including a drug lord) and injuring two law enforcement officers.
On April 29, 2022, Alabama murder suspect Casey White managed to escape Lauderdale County Jail aided by correctional officer Vicky White (no relation).  The two were captured in Evansville, Indiana on May 9, 2022. Vicky died hours later that day from a self-inflicted gunshot wound suffered just prior to capture.
On May 12, 2022, Gonzalo Lopez assaulted a correctional officer while on a Texas Department of Criminal Justice prison bus and escaped from custody near Centerville, Texas. On June 2, 2022, he killed a family of five in their home after several weeks on the run. He was shot dead by law enforcement shortly afterwards.
On December 13, 2022, Roberto José Carmona escaped while on temporary leave to his wife's house in Córdoba, Argentina, before proceeding to kill a passing taxi driver and steal his cab. After crashing the car, he attacked and injured four others before being apprehended four hours later. Carmona had been convicted of abducting, raping and killing a teenager in 1986, and had killed two inmates in separate incidents in 1994 and 1997, respectively.
On January 1, 2023, gunmen stormed a prison in Ciudad Juárez, Mexico, killing 10 prison guards and four inmates. Fourteen prisoners escaped after the raid.

People who escaped multiple times

See also
 Prison escape
 List of helicopter prison escapes
 List of prisoner-of-war escapes

References

Works cited
 

Lists of events